Asanuma (浅沼, "shallow swamp")  is a Japanese surname. Notable people with the surname include: 

, Japanese politician and assassinated head of the Japan Socialist Party
Santy Asanuma, Palauan senator
, Japanese voice actor
, Japanese footballer
, Japanese musician
, Japanese baseball player

Japanese-language surnames